Martin Grävare (born 29 August 1959) is a sailor from Göteborg, Sweden, who represented his country at the 1984 Summer Olympics in Los Angeles, United States as crew member in the Soling. With helmsman Magnus Grävare and fellow crew member Eric Wallin they took the 10th place.

References

Living people
1959 births
Sailors at the 1984 Summer Olympics – Soling
Olympic sailors of Sweden
Swedish male sailors (sport)
Sportspeople from Gothenburg